Hugh Pate Harris (June 15, 1909 – November 3, 1979) was a United States Army four-star general who served as Commanding General, U.S. Continental Army Command (CG CONARC) from 1964 to 1965.

Military career
Harris was born in Anderson, Alabama on June 15, 1909. After graduating from Columbia Military Academy, he attended and graduated from the United States Military Academy at West Point in 1931, receiving his commission in the infantry.

Early in his career he was involved in the early development of airborne units and doctrine. During World War II he was Chief of Staff of the 13th Airborne Division.

He served as Chief of Staff of the XVIII Airborne Corps, and commanded a regiment in the 40th Infantry Division during the Korean War. After the war he was Deputy Chief of Staff, Eighth United States Army.

He took command of the Berlin Brigade in 1955, and in 1956 assumed command of the 11th Airborne Division. In April 1960, Harris became Commanding General, U.S. Army Infantry Center and Commandant, U.S. Army Infantry School at Fort Benning. In 1961 he was named commander of I Corps, and the next year Commanding General, Seventh United States Army.  At retirement in 1965, General Harris was Commanding General of the U.S. Continental Army Command.

Harris' awards and decorations included the Army Distinguished Service Medal, Silver Star, Legion of Merit with two oak leaf clusters, Combat Infantryman Badge, Glider Badge and Airborne Badge.

Post military career
After retiring from the army, Harris became the President of The Citadel, a position he held from 1965 to 1970. He was the third consecutive four star officer to hold that position. Harris died on November 3, 1979 and was buried in Arlington National Cemetery, next to his first wife, Jane Boyd Harris (1911–1958). His second wife, Lieutenant Colonel Kathleen B. Harris, Ret. (1917–2001), was buried next to him later.

References

1909 births
1979 deaths
People from Lauderdale County, Alabama
United States Army generals
United States Military Academy alumni
United States Army personnel of World War II
United States Army personnel of the Korean War
Recipients of the Legion of Merit
Recipients of the Silver Star
Burials at Arlington National Cemetery
Recipients of the Distinguished Service Medal (US Army)
Presidents of The Citadel, The Military College of South Carolina
20th-century American academics